With Open Gates: The Forced Collective Suicide of European Nations, is 2015 anti-immigration video released during the European migrant crisis. The video lasts for 19 and a half minutes.

The video focuses on the perceived threat posed by mass migration. It was condemned by Vice Media as anti-migrant and counterfactual.

History
According to the Anti-Defamation League, the video originated on in a discussion forum on 8chan, in a subforum entitled "Politically Incorrect", where it was created by a group of users led by the user "Gex." It was featured on websites including Breitbart News. The number of viewings surged in the wake of the November 2015 Paris attacks.

The video was composed of footage from news reports and interviews, many of which are taken out of context and unrelated to refugees or migration. It had over 20 million views when it was removed by YouTube following allegations of copyright infringement; it quickly reappeared on other social media sites.

Marjorie Taylor Greene, who was elected to the United States House of Representatives in 2020 shared the video on Facebook in 2018.

Reception
Vice Media described the video as "a racist propaganda film." The Anti-Defamation League called it "a virulently anti-refugee propaganda video". Steve Deace wrote a column about the video in The Washington Times.

References

External links 
With Open Gates The forced collective suicide of European nations on Dailymotion

Calling Bullshit on the Anti-Refugee Video Taking the Internet By Storm
European migrant crisis
Anti-immigration politics in Europe
Propaganda films
2015 documentary films
Documentary films about immigration to Europe